Huddersfield Town's 1957–58 campaign was a fairly mediocre season for the Town under Bill Shankly, who was taking charge for his first full season at Leeds Road. The season will be best remembered for the match against Charlton Athletic at The Valley on 21 December 1957. The match finished 7–6 to Charlton, after Charlton had only ten men for the majority of the match and the fact that with 27 minutes remaining, Town were leading 5–1 before losing the match. This remains the only match in professional football where a team has scored 6 goals and lost the match.

Squad at the start of the season

Review
Bill Shankly's first full season in charge compromising a complete mixture of results, although Town did finish the season in 9th place with 44 points, although they were 12 points behind 2nd placed Blackburn Rovers. The season also saw Vic Metcalfe make his last appearance in a Town shirt in March in a match against Sheffield United.

The other main highlight of the season was the match at The Valley on 21 December 1957. The match against Charlton Athletic. The match finished 7–6 to Charlton, this after Charlton had only ten men for the majority of the match and the fact that with 27 minutes remaining, Town were leading 5–1 before losing the match. This remains the only match in professional football, where a team has scored 6 goals and lost the match. Incredibly, Town and Charlton played each other 4 times that season, and 24 goals were scored in those matches.

Squad at the end of the season

Results

Division Two

FA Cup

Appearances and goals

1957-58
English football clubs 1957–58 season